Mahezomus is a monotypic genus of hubbardiid short-tailed whipscorpions, first described by Mark Harvey in 2001. Its single species, Mahezomus apicoporus is distributed in Seychelles.

References 

Schizomida genera
Monotypic arachnid genera